DeWitt Williams (October 12, 1919 – January 27, 2016) was an American politician in the state of South Carolina. He served in the South Carolina House of Representatives as a member of the Democratic Party from 1981 to 1986, representing Berkeley County, South Carolina. He resides in Saint Stephen, South Carolina. He served as mayor pro tempore of Saint Stephen from 1974 to 1979. A portion of is South Carolina Highway 45 in Berkeley County is named "DeWitt Williams Boulevard", in his honor.

References

1919 births
2016 deaths
Democratic Party members of the South Carolina House of Representatives
People from St. Stephen, South Carolina